Triumph Over Disaster: The Hurricane Andrew Story is a 1993 American drama film directed by Marvin J. Chomsky and written by Casey Kelly. The film stars Ted Wass, Brynn Thayer, John Getz, Veronica Cartwright, Arnetia Walker, Carmen Argenziano, Jill Schoelen, Chris Demetral and Brian McNamara. The film premiered on NBC on May 24, 1993.

Plot

Cast  
Ted Wass as Bryan Norcross
Brynn Thayer as Sandra Channing
John Getz as Doug Hulin
Veronica Cartwright as Carla Hulin
Arnetia Walker as Paulette Rickles
Carmen Argenziano as Ed Lopez
Jill Schoelen as Ruth Henderson
Chris Demetral as Robin Hulin
Brian McNamara as Cal Kessler
Eileen Heckart as Shelley
Kim Hunter as Elsa Rael
George Grizzard as Dr. Sheets
Mark Adair-Rios as Marco Lielli 
Anthony Finazzo as Justin Hulin
Alexandra Núñez as Carolyn Hulin
Steve Schneider as Nick Rigley
Maya Simmonds as Treesha Rickles
Collette Wilson as Leslie Ames
Steve Roth as Spence
Christine Page as Co-Anchor
Alfredo Álvarez Calderón as Ramon Menendez 
Robin Trapp as Carmen Lopez
George Ortuzar as Mel 
Nick Ondarza as Emilio
Anthony Giaimo as Benno
Kathryn Klvana as Georgia
Paul Sylvan as Vince Lielli
John Archie as Samaritan
Bryan Norcross as Ted

References

External links
 

1993 television films
1993 drama films
1993 films
American drama television films
NBC network original films
Films about tropical cyclones
Films directed by Marvin J. Chomsky
Films scored by Laurence Rosenthal
1990s English-language films
1990s American films
Films set in 1992